The 2013–14 Super Division (52nd edition), Algeria's top tier basketball club competition, ran from September 12, 2013 through May 31, 2014.

ABC Super Division Participants (2013–14 Season)

Regular Season (September 27, 2013 -February , 2014)

Niveau A

 Note: Small number and number in brackets indicate round number and leg, respectively Next scheduled games

Regular season standings
Updated as of 13 October 2017.
<onlyinclude>

Niveau A

 Advance to play-offs

Niveau B

 Advance to play-offs

Play-offs (February 21-May 17, 2014)

 3 loss by default (no point awarded)
 Advance to championship Final

Championship final

Team champions

References

Algerian Basketball Championship seasons
League
Algeria